The Haunted is a 2019 Philippine horror-action drama television series starring Jake Cuenca, Shaina Magdayao, Denise Laurel, and Queenzy Calma. The series aired on ABS-CBN's Yes Weekend! Sunday block and worldwide via The Filipino Channel from December 8, 2019 to February 9, 2020, replacing Parasite Island and was replaced by 24/7.

Synopsis
Jordan and Aileen bought a house and have a happy family. But unknown to them, Jordan's past haunt them, literally.

Plot 
Jordan and Aileen moved to a very old house. Unknown by Aileen, Jordan cheated with Monica but Jordan doesn't love her. One night, while Monica tries to kiss Jordan, Jordan accidentally kills Monica and buries her in a house where they just moved in. Now, Monica is trying to get justice to her unlawful homicide incident. While trying to do this, Monica tries to get revenge by haunting the whole family.  Their daughter, Angel, is being haunted by Monica whilst having a disease and when Jordan and Aileen saw it, they immediately rushed her to the hospital. While Angel is healing, Monica came back to see her and took her. While Monica is still trying to haunt the family, she took care of Angel and a few years passed by when Jordan and Aileen found her again. Angel doesn't remember her real mother and father so she writes bad things about them. After Angel saw the truth, Monica became very angry and tries to capture her. Meanwhile, Aileen and the police are trying to investigate about Monica. When they found out that Jordan was the killer, they immediately tried to arrest Jordan but Jordan fights back and gets shot. Meanwhile, Monica successfully captures Angel and Jordan also didn't notice very soon that he is already dead after he got shot. Angel falls to the ground but is saved by her dead grandma. Monica also got justice and is now in peace. After another incident, Angel celebrates her birthday. While her birthday is going, Jordan's ghost is just behind there, crying, also celebrating her birthday.

Cast and characters

Main cast
Jake Cuenca as Jordan Sebastian 
Shaina Magdayao as Aileen Robles-Sebastian 
Denise Laurel as Monica Mendez
Althea Ruedas as older Angel Robles-Sebastian
Queenzy Calma as young Angel Robles-Sebastian

Supporting cast 
Simon Ibarra as Caloy Delgado
Ruby Ruiz as Jonalyn
Alex Castro as PO1 Bernard Robles Jr. 
Victor Silayan as Rommel Mendez
Ingrid dela Paz as Lorraine 
Sheenly Gener as Nikki
Eian Rances as Kiel Valenzuela
Erlinda Villalobos as Bening

Special Participation
Rita Avila as Anita
Ana Abad Santos as Salve
Krystal Mejes as young Aileen
Onyok Pineda as Enchong
Josh De Guzman as Ren-ren 
Nhikzy Calma as Miyong

Ratings

See also
 List of programs broadcast by ABS-CBN
 List of ABS-CBN drama series

References

External links
 
 

ABS-CBN drama series
Philippine horror fiction television series
2019 Philippine television series debuts
2020 Philippine television series endings
2020s Philippine television series
Television series by Dreamscape Entertainment Television
Television shows set in the Philippines
Filipino-language television shows